George Van Heerden (born 11 September 2003) is a South African cricketer. In October 2021, he was named as the captain of the South Africa Under-19s for the 2021–22 CSA Provincial T20 Knock-Out tournament. He made his Twenty20 debut on 8 October 2021, for the under-19 team in the T20 Knock-Out tournament. In November 2021, he was named as the captain of South Africa's team for the 2022 ICC Under-19 Cricket World Cup in the West Indies.

References

External links
 

2003 births
Living people
South African cricketers
Place of birth missing (living people)